The following radio stations broadcast on AM frequency 630 kHz: 630 AM is a regional U.S. broadcast frequency. 630 kHz is a Philippine clear-channel frequency used by NTC. DZMM share Class A status at 630 kHz and being defunctional because of legislative franchise lapsed

Argentina
 LW8 in San Salvador de Jujuy
 LS5 in Buenos Aires
 LU4 in Comodoro Rivadavia, Chubut

Australia
 7RN in Queenstown, TA
 2PB in Sydney, NSW
 4QN in Townsville, QLD
 6AL in Albany, WA

Bangladesh
 S2D-1 in Dakha

Brazil
 ZYH422 in Macapá
 ZYH-636 in Campo Sales
 ZYI-384 in Cuiabá
 ZYJ284 in Curitiba
 ZYJ-920 in Aracaju
 ZYJ-466 in Rio de Janeiro
 ZYK259 in Lago Vermelha
 ZYK-289 in Santa Maria, Rio Grande do Sul
 ZYK-302 in São Lourenço do Oeste
 ZYK-613 in Macapá
 ZYK-635 in Presidente Prudente
 ZYL-299 in Uberaba
 ZYH-636 in Campos Sales, Ceará

Canada

Chile
 CB-063 in Valparaíso

China 
 CNR Business Radio

Colombia
 HJFD in Manizales
 HJE69 in Inírida, Guainía

Cuba
 CMHA in Camagüey
 CMOA in Nueva Gerona

Dominican Republic
 HIAF in San Fernando de Monte Cristi

Ecuador
 HCHA2 in Quevedo

El Salvador
 YSLN in San Salvador

Honduras
 HRLP 7 in La Ceiba

India
 VUT3 in Thrissur

Indonesia
 P2MB.. in Jakarta
 8FR200 in Ujung Pandang

Kuwait
 9KV-4 in Kuwait City

Liberia
 ELBC in Monrovia

Mexico
 XECCQ-AM in Cancun, Quintana Roo
 XEERO-AM in Esteros, Tamaulipas
 XEFB-AM in Guadalupe, Nuevo León
 XEFU-AM in Cosamaloapan de Carpio, Verzcruz
 XEFX-AM in Guaymas, Sonora
 XEPBGJ-AM in Guadalajara, Jalisco

New Zealand
 ZL2YZ in Napier/Hawke's Bay/Opapa

Cook Islands
 E5ZC (formerly ZK1ZC) in Black Rock

Norway
 LKA in Vigra

Pakistan
 APL-1 in Lahore

Panama
 HOJ 35 in Chitre

Paraguay
 ZP50 in Areguá

Peru
 OAX1T in Jaén

Philippines
Stations in bold are clear-channel stations

Portugal
 CSA222 in Chaves
 CSA305 in Miranda do Douro
 CSA342 in Montemor-o-Velho

Russian Federation
 RW3 in Saratov

Singapore
 ZHL-AM (now Gold 905) in Singapore

South Korea
 HLSE-AM in Imje
 HLCY-AM in Yeosu

Thailand
 HSAC-AM in Bangkok

Tunisia
 Établissement de la Radiodiffusion-Télévision Tunisienne in Tunis-Djedeida

Turkey
 TAZ-1 in Çukurova

United Kingdom
BBC Three Counties Radio at Lewsey Farm

United States

Venezuela
 YVJA in San Fernando
 YVKA in Caracas

External links

 FCC list of radio stations on 630 kHz

References

Lists of radio stations by frequency